Sodium hypophosphite (NaPO2H2, also known as sodium phosphinate) is the sodium salt of hypophosphorous acid and is often encountered as the monohydrate, NaPO2H2·H2O. It is a solid at room temperature, appearing as odorless white crystals. It is soluble in water, and easily absorbs moisture from the air.

Sodium hypophosphite should be kept in a cool, dry place, isolated from oxidizing materials. It decomposes into phosphine which is irritating to the respiratory tract and disodium phosphate.

2 NaH2PO2 → PH3 + Na2HPO4

Uses 

Like other hypophosphites, sodium hypophosphite can reduce metal ions back into base metal. This forms the basis for electroless nickel plating (Ni-P), which is its main industrial application. With this method, a durable nickel-phosphorus film can coat objects with irregular surfaces, such as in avionics, aviation and the petroleum field.

Sodium hypophosphite is capable of reducing nickel ions in solution to metallic nickel on metal substrates as well as on plastic substrates. The latter requires that the substrate is activated with fine particles of palladium. The resulting nickel deposit contains up to 15% phosphorus.

It has been investigated as a food additive.

DEA List I status
The United States Drug Enforcement Administration designated sodium hypophosphite as a List I chemical under 21 CFR 1310.02 effective November 17, 2001, specifically mentioning the compound together with several other salts of hypophosphorous acid.

References

Sodium compounds
Phosphinates
Inorganic phosphorus compounds
Reducing agents